The Thomas E. Hess House is a historic house on Arkansas Highway 14 in Marcella, Arkansas.  It is a two-story I-house, five bays wide, with a side gable roof, weatherboard siding, and stone foundation.  A two-story porch extends across the middle three bays of the north-facing front facade, with some jigsaw decorative work and turned balusters.  An ell extends to the rear, and the rear porch has been enclosed.  The house was built in 1900 by Thomas E. Hess, grandson of William Hess, the area's first white settler.  Other buildings on the property include a barn, stone cellar, and a log corn crib that was originally built as a schoolhouse.

The house was listed on the National Register of Historic Places in 1983.

See also
National Register of Historic Places listings in Stone County, Arkansas

References

Houses on the National Register of Historic Places in Arkansas
Houses completed in 1900
Houses in Stone County, Arkansas
National Register of Historic Places in Stone County, Arkansas